1001 Pennsylvania Avenue is a highrise office building in Washington D.C. on Pennsylvania Avenue. The  building has 14 floors and its construction ended in 1987. The building serves as the headquarters of The Carlyle Group.

See also
List of tallest buildings in Washington, D.C.

References 

Skyscraper office buildings in Washington, D.C.
Hines Interests Limited Partnership

Office buildings completed in 1987
1987 establishments in Washington, D.C.